True Confessions is a 1981 American neo-noir crime drama film directed by Ulu Grosbard and starring Robert De Niro and Robert Duvall as the brothers Spellacy, a priest and police detective. Produced by Chartoff-Winkler Productions, it is adapted from the novel of the same name by John Gregory Dunne, loosely based on the Black Dahlia murder case of 1947. Dunne wrote the screenplay with his wife, novelist Joan Didion. The film was released on September 25, 1981, receiving generally positive reviews from critics.

Plot
In 1948, Rev. Desmond Spellacy is a young and ambitious Roman Catholic monsignor in the Los Angeles archdiocese. His older brother Tom is a hard-working homicide detective with the Los Angeles Police Department. They are fond of each other, but spend little time together.

Des is the pride and joy of aging Cardinal Danaher because of his skill at developing church projects while keeping down costs. He cuts a corner now and then, overlooking the shady side of construction mogul Jack Amsterdam, a lay Catholic who uses his ties to the Monsignor for the congregation's benefit but mainly for his own.

One day in Los Angeles, a young woman is found brutally murdered, her body cut in two in a vacant lot. Tom Spellacy and his partner, Frank Crotty, are put in charge of the case. The woman, Lois Fazenda, is labeled "the Virgin Tramp" by the local press for apparently being a Catholic as well as a prostitute, turning it into a sensational case.

Tom Spellacy's investigation leads him to a local madam, Brenda Samuels. Tom was well acquainted with Brenda years earlier while working as a bagman for Amsterdam, whose corruption extends to the local prostitution ring.

Brenda has called the police to report the death of a Catholic priest while he was having sex with one of her prostitutes. While there, Brenda reproaches Tom for doing nothing for her while she was sent to prison for running one of Jack's whorehouses. Tom later believes the dead girl appeared in a stag film and obtains a copy. He and Frank notice that one of the girls in the movie was present at Brenda's brothel on the day they came to retrieve the philandering priest.

Tom now wants Brenda's help in tracking down the girl who made the movie with the murdered girl. Frank spots the girl a few days later being taken into the jail entrance after a roundup. They learn that the dead girl was a favorite of a local porno movie director named Standard because of her tattoo. Tom learns that Standard did his filming in a deserted army post in the foothills outside Los Angeles.

At lunch with his brother, Tom provokes Amsterdam with secret facts about Amsterdam's dark side, which makes the Monsignor increasingly uncomfortable. Des tells the Cardinal the time has come to cut church ties with Amsterdam for good. Des discusses "getting rid of Jack" with his cronies who remind him that such a thing would not be easily done. Sonny, a corrupt local city council member and local mortician, proposes that they give Jack a salutation dinner.

Tom Spellacy's anger builds as his brother organizes a Catholic "layman of the year" banquet for Amsterdam as a gesture of appreciation before ending the church's relationship with him. Tom walks up to Amsterdam at the banquet and pulls off his sash while asking him loudly: "Were you wearing this when you were banging Lois Fazenda?" Jack attacks Tom and they scream obscenities at each other.

Tom goes to Standard's "studio" and finds the floor and a bathtub covered with dried blood. He also finds Chinese food, which the medical examiner doing the autopsy had found in her stomach. Tom and Frank go looking for Standard but learn that he had been killed in a car accident twelve hours after the murder.

Tom wants to drag in Amsterdam for questioning simply to humiliate him in public but Frank talks him out of it. Tom starts digging around and discovers that the dead girl had been having sex with several community leaders.

Amsterdam's lawyer, Dan Campion, subtly warns the Monsignor that his brother the cop had better lay off unless they want it revealed publicly that Des, too, knew the murdered girl. She met the Monsignor only once in passing, whereas she had a sexual relationship with both Amsterdam and the lawyer. But the simple fact that Des had any kind of involvement in such a lurid case could permanently stain his reputation with the church.

Tom Spellacy won't be talked out of it. His determination becomes complete when Brenda is found dead, an apparent suicide. He decides to have Amsterdam picked up and taken to headquarters, which in turn leads to the Monsignor being treated the same way.

His rising career curtailed, Des asks to be relocated to a remote parish in the desert, the same place to which his mentor in the diocese had been exiled, the location where the movie begins and ends, where Des and Tom meet after years apart. By the time Tom comes to see him, Des is dying. Tom feels everything is his fault, but Des is at peace and absolves his brother of any and all blame.

Cast

 Robert De Niro as Monsignor Desmond 'Des' Spellacy
 Robert Duvall as Detective Tom Spellacy
 Charles Durning as Jack Amsterdam
 Cyril Cusack as Cardinal Danaher
 Burgess Meredith as Monsignor Seamus Fargo
 Kenneth McMillan as Detective Frank Crotty
 Ed Flanders as Dan T. Campion
 Dan Hedaya as Howard Terkel
 Rose Gregorio as Brenda Samuels
 Jeanette Nolan as Mrs. Spellacy
 Missy Cleveland as Lois Fazenda
 Tom Hill as Mr. Fazenda
 Gwen Van Dam as Mrs. Fazenda
 Jorge Cervera Jr. as Eduardo Duarte
 Darwyn Carson as Lorna Keane
 Pat Corley as Sonny McDonough
 Richard Foronjy as Ambulance Driver
 James Hong as Coroner Wong
 Kirk Brennan as Acolyte Toomey

Model for monsignor
The character of Msgr. Spellacy is thought to be based on Msgr. Benjamin Hawkes, who oversaw growth of the Archdiocese of Los Angeles from the 1950s into the 1980s. De Niro prepared for the role of the monsignor by observing Msgr. Hawkes as he said Mass. Conductor Paul Salamunovich who was choir director for Hawkes' church choir at St. Basil's parish at the time, was brought in to coach De Niro on the sung Latin responses of the Mass and to conduct choral segments for the film.

Production
Producers Irwin Winkler and Robert Chartoff acquired the rights to John Gregory Dunne's 1977 novel in April 1978. By October 1978, Dunne and his wife, screenwriter Joan Didion, had completed a script, and Paul Schrader was originally intended to revise the screenplay and direct. However, Didion ultimately rewrote the script, and Ulu Grosbard was hired as director. When hired, Robert De Niro had just two weeks to drop as much weight as possible that he had put on for Raging Bull. Filming took place around Los Angeles in 1979, including at Echo Park, Union Station, and Alverno High School. Production went over-schedule, forcing original composer Bill Conti to drop out. The 15-week shoot was completed in mid-May 1980 near Lancaster, California.

Release
The film was theatrically released in the United States on September 25, 1981. It was originally scheduled to be released sometime in 1980, and then in February 1981, before settling on the September date.

Home media
True Confessions was released to DVD by MGM Home Video on April 17, 2007 as a Region 1 widescreen DVD, by 20th Century Fox Home Entertainment in 2009 as a part of the Robert De Niro 7 Movie Collection (with True Confessions as the seventh disc of the set), and to Blu-Ray DVD by Kino Lorber on October 7, 2014.

Reception

Box office
True Confessions opened at four theaters, making $154,923 in its opening weekend. It then expanded to 417 theaters in its fourth weekend of release, making $1.5 million, and peaked at 458 theaters in its sixth weekend, when it made $1 million. It went on to gross $12.9 million at the box office.

Critical response
On review aggregator website Rotten Tomatoes, the film holds an approval rating of 69% based on 16 reviews, with an average rating of 8.1/10. Metacritic assigned the film a weighted average score of 68 out of 100, based on 12 critics, indicating "generally favorable reviews".

New York Times critic Vincent Canby declared the film "a reminder of just how good commercial American movies can be when the right people come together."
Roger Ebert of The Chicago Sun Times gave the film 3 stars out of 4. He wrote that while the performances were good and some individual scenes very well-crafted, the movie as a whole was disappointing: "the attentions of the filmmakers were concentrated so fiercely on individual moments that nobody ever stood back to ask what the story was about. It's frustrating to sit through a movie filled with clues and leads and motivations, only to discover at the end that the filmmakers can't be bothered with finishing the story."

The film was panned by William F. Buckley, Jr., who had praised the original novel. In his review of the film in the National Review, Buckley complained that "Robert De Niro is badly miscast. He is never entirely convincing.'"

References

External links
 
 True Confessions at Rotten Tomatoes
 

1981 films
1981 crime drama films
American crime drama films
American neo-noir films
American police detective films
Crime films based on actual events
Films about Catholic priests
Films based on American novels
Films directed by Ulu Grosbard
Films produced by Irwin Winkler
Films produced by Robert Chartoff
Films scored by Georges Delerue
Films set in 1947
Films set in 1948
Films set in Los Angeles
United Artists films
1980s English-language films
1980s American films